The Dohrmann Building, also known as the Dohrmann Hotel Supply Company Building, is a historic building in San Jose, California. It was built in 1926 for A.B.C. Dohrmann, a businessman from San Francisco. It was first used as an office building by the Dohrmann Hotel Supply Company in 1927.

The building was designed in the Classical Revival and Spanish Colonial Revival architectural styles. It has been listed on the National Register of Historic Places since February 20, 1986.

References

Buildings and structures on the National Register of Historic Places in California	
National Register of Historic Places in Santa Clara County, California
Neoclassical architecture in California
Mission Revival architecture in California
Office buildings completed in 1926